The team rosters for the 2001 South American U-20 Championship football tournament held in Ecuador. The ten national teams involved in the tournament were required to register a squad of 20 players; only players in these squads were eligible to take part in the tournament.

Players name marked in bold have been capped at full international level.

Argentina 

Coach: José Néstor Pekerman 

(Source for player names:)

Bolivia 

Coach: Adolfo Flores 

(Source for player names:)

Brazil 

Coach: Carlos Cesar Ramos Custodio  

(N°1)Rubens Fernando Moedim GK 08/04/1982 Sport Club Cortinthians (Brazil)                                                                                                                                                                                          (N°2)Marcos Douglas Sisenando DF 26/07/1981 Cruzeiro Esporte Clube (Brazil)                                                                                                                                                                                                                     (N°3)Eduardo Luis Abonizio Souza DF 18/05/1981 Guarani Futebol Clube (Brazil)
(N°4)Marcos Roberto da Silva Barbosa DF 21/10/1982 Sport Club Corinthians (Brazil)
(N°5)Eduardo Nascimento da Costa MF 23/09/1982 Gremio Foot-Ball Alegrense (Brazil)
(N°6)Leilton Silva dos Santos DF 07/03/1982 Esporte Clube Vitoria (Brazil)
(N°7)Ewerthon Henrique de Souza FW 10/06/1981 Sport Club Cortinthians (Brazil)
(N°8)Fabio Rochemback MF 12/10/1981 Sport Club Internacional (Brazil)
(N°9)Adriano Leite Ribeiro FW 17/02/1982 Clube de Regatas do Flamengo (Brazil)
(N°10)Julio Cesar Pereira Baptista MF 10//01/1982 Sao Paulo Futebol Clube (Brazil)
(N°11)Marcio Miranda Freitas Rocha da Silva MF 20/03/1981 Paulista Futebol Clube (Brazil)
(N°12)Marcio Augusto dos Santos Aguiar GK 20/12/1981 Sao Paulo Futebol Clube (Brazil)
(N°13)Valnei Souza dos Santos DF 01/09/1981 Santa Cruz Futebol Clube (Brazil)
(N°14)Fernando Menegazzo MF 03/05/1981 Esporte Clube Juventude (Brazil)
(N°15)Anderson Alves da Silva DF 10/01/1981 Clube de Regatas do Flamengo (Brazil)
(N°16)Andre Luiz Tavares MF 30/07/1983 Clube de Regatas do Flamengo (Brazil)
(N°17)Glauber Vian Correa DF 09/02/1981 Guarani Esporte Clube (Brazil)
(N°18)Leonardo Mendes Lima da Silva MF 14/02/1982 Club de Regatas Vasco da Gama (Brazil)
(N°19)Jackson Nogueira FW 09/01/1982 Clube de Regatas do Flameng (Brazil)
(N°20)Andre Felipe Seixas Dias FW 03/11/1981 Santos Futebol Clube (Brazil)

Chile 

Coach: Héctor Pinto 

(Source for player names:)
(N°14)Jaime Jorquera MF 13/03/1981 Club de Deportes Cobreloa (Chile)                                                                                                                                                                                                                        
(N°9)Luis Reinaldo Flores Abarca  FW 03/05/1982 Club Deportivo Palestino (Chile)
(N°6)Cesar Antonio Enriquez Iturra MF 01/10/1981 Universidad de Chile (Chile)
(N°11)Jose Luis Villanueva FW 05/11/1981 Club Deportivo Huachipato (Chile)
(N°16)Juan Jose Albornoz MF 12/02/1981 Rangers de Talca (Chile)
(N°15)Ruben Eduardo Bascuñan MF 23/02/1982 Colo Colo (Chile)
(N°22)**Rainer Klaus Witrh GK 25/10/1982 Universidad Catolica debut en primera A año 2003.                                                                                                                                                           
www.partidosdelaroja.com/1970/01/nominas-de-chile-para-sudamericanos-sub-20.html
Los jugadores que estan con 1 asterisco * fueron reservas temporales y con 2 parciales.
[The players what are they with 1 asterisk * were resevertions temporary and with 2** partial].

Colombia 

Coach: Alfredo Araujo 

(Source for player names:)

Ecuador 

Coach: Jose Maria Andrade  and Fabian Burbano 

(N°1)Omar Estrada Soto GK 29/03/1982 Liga Deportiva Universitaria Quito (Ecuador)
(N°2)Jose Luis Perlaza Napa DF 09/06/1981 Centro Deportivo Olmedo (Ecuador)
(N°3)Jorge Daniel Guagua DF 28/10/1981 El Nacional (Ecuador)
(N°4)Pool Geovanny Gavilanez Solis DF 08/03/1981 Club Sport Emelec (Ecuador)
(N°5)Camilo David Hurtado Hurtado MF 14/03/1981 Liga Deportiva Universitaria Quito (Ecuador)
(N°6)Jorge Albeto Vargas Oyola DF 30/01/1981 Liga Deportiva Universitaria Quito (Ecuador)
(N°7)Abdala Jaime Bucaram Pulley MF 25/03/1982 Club Sport Emelec (Ecuador)
(N°8)Lider Leonardo Mejia MF 26/01/1981 Liga Deportiva Universitaria Quito (Ecuador)
(N°9)Estuardo Cristian Quiñonez Montaño FW 14/04/1981 Universidad Catolica (Ecuador)
(N°10)Gerardo Javier Sacon Intriago MF 01/09/1981 Club Sport Emelec (Ecuador)
(N°11)Franklin Agustin Salas Narvaez FW 30/08/1981 Liga Deportiva Universitaria Quito (Ecuador)
(N°12)Rorys Andres Aragon Espinoza GK 28/06/1982 Club Sport Emelec (Ecuador)
(N°13)Javier Fabricio Delgado DF 01/10/1982 Tecnico Universitario (Ecuador)
(N°14)Carlos Alberto Sotomayor MF 12/01/1981 Deportivo Quito (Ecuador)
(N°15)Pablo Roberto Jarrin FW 05/09/1981 El Nacional (Ecuador)
(N°16)Jorge Zambrano FW 02/07/1983 Audax Octubrino (Ecuador)
(N°17)William Angelis Cuero Quiñonez DF 01/06/1981 Barcelona SC (Ecuador)
(N°18)Juan Carlos Godoy Cuero MF 28/12/1981 Universidad Catolica (Ecuador)
(N°19)Roberto Javier Mina Delgado FW 07/11/1984 Club Deportivo Star Club (Ecuador)
(N°20)Walter Ramiro Iza Garcia FW 08/02/1981 Sociedad Deportiva Aucas (Ecuador)

Paraguay 

Coach: Cristobal Maldonado 

(N°1)Diego Daniel Barreto GK 16/07/1981 Club Cerro Porteño (Paraguay)
(N°2)David Raul Villalba DF 13/04/1982 Club Olimpia (Paraguay)
(N°3)Emilio Damian Martinez DF 10/04/1981 Club Cerro Porteño (Paraguay)
(N°4)Felipe Ariel Gimenez Miranda DF 26/05/1981 Club Olimpia (Paraguay)
(N°5)Pedro Juan Benitez Dominguez DF 23/03/1981 Sportivo Luqueño (Paraguay)
(N°6)Santiago Gabriel Saucedo Gonzalez FW 06/09/1981 Club Cerro Porteño (Paraguay)
(N°7)Alejandro Damian Da Silva Mercado FW 18/05/1983 Udinese Calcio S.p.A. (Italy)
(N°8)Jorge Orlando Britez Larramendi MF 08/02/1981 Sporting Clube de Braga (Portugal)
(N°9)Julio Valentin Gonzalez FW 26/08/1981 Club Guarani (Paraguay)
(N°10)Tomas Gonzalez FW 03/07/1982 Juventus Turin (Italy)
(N°11)Diego Antonio Figueredo Matiauda MF 28/04/1982 Club Olimpia (Paraguay)
(N°12)Eduardo Caceres GK 12/08/1981 Sportivo Luqueño (Paraguay)
(N°13)Victor Cabrera MF 28/06/1982 Club Guarani (Paraguay)
(N°14)Gabriel Benigno Estigarribia DF 20/12/1981 Atletico Colegiales (Paraguay)
(N°15)Pedro Anibal Sosa Talavera MF 06/04/1981 Sol de America (Paraguay)
(N°16)Walter Ariel Fretes Bogarin MF 18/05/1982 Club Cerro Porteño (Paraguay)
(N°17)Victor Salinas MF 15/02/1982 Club 12 de Octubre de Itagua (Paraguay)
(N°18)Daniel Ferreira Caballero FW 25/09/1982 Club Olimpia (Paraguay)
(N°19)Cristian Fatecha FW 15/03/1982 Sportivo Luqueño (Paraguay)
(N°20)Diego Anibal Santa Cruz Cantero MF 29/10/1982 Cerro Cora (Paraguay)

Peru 

Coach: Julio César Uribe 

(Source for player names:)

Uruguay 

Coach: Víctor Púa 

(Source for player names:)

Venezuela 

Coach: Richard Páez 

(Source for player names:)

References 

South American U-20 Championship squads